The Bollinhurst Reservoir was constructed in Lyme Park in 1872 for the Stockport District Waterworks Company.  At the time of the First World War, it had a capacity of 84.46 million gallons.

References

Reservoirs in Cheshire